Caroline Acheson (11 September 1934 – 16 January 2023) was an Irish Fianna Fáil politician.

Career
Acheson was born in Tipperary in 1934, daughter of Matt Barlow, Republican activist in the Irish War of Independence. She was educated at the Presentation Convent, Clonmel, the Convent of Mercy, Carlow and the London School of Business Studies. Acheson worked as a company director in the family business before becoming involved in politics.

Acheson was elected to South Tipperary County Council in 1974. She was elected to Dáil Éireann for the Tipperary South constituency at the 1981 general election, but lost her seat at the following February 1982 election.

Acheson was a sister of former Senator Tras Honan. She was chairperson of the Irish Red Cross Society from 1981 to 1984.

Acheson died on 16 January 2023, at the age of 88. Tánaiste and former Taoiseach Micheál Martin paid tribute to her.

See also

Families in the Oireachtas

References

1934 births
2023 deaths
Fianna Fáil TDs
Local councillors in South Tipperary
Members of the 22nd Dáil
20th-century women Teachtaí Dála
People from County Tipperary